Richard Michael Sofield (born December 16, 1956) is a former Major League Baseball outfielder. He was the Pittsburgh Pirates  third base coach from 2013 to 2016 and was the manager of their Class-A South Atlantic League team the West Virginia Power during the 2012 season.

Early life
Sofield was born in Cheyenne, Wyoming but moved to Morris Plains, New Jersey as a child. In New Jersey, he played multiple sports and was offered a scholarship to play college football at Michigan but turned it down in order to pursue a professional baseball career.

Playing career

Coaching career
After his playing career ended, he became the assistant baseball coach at the University of South Carolina and later the head coach at the University of Utah (1988–1994). After leaving Utah, he was a minor league manager for the Harrisburg Senators, Las Vegas 51s, and Colorado Springs Sky Sox.

He has been the head baseball coach at the University of South Carolina Beaufort and worked extensively with Baseball Factory, a player development and scouting service. His final day with USCB was  Monday, November 14, 2011. Sofield's record with the NAIA Sand Sharks over three seasons is 101–56. In 2011, USCB was ranked No. 18 in the NAIA Top 25, the highest spot in program history.

Sofield and Pirates manager Clint Hurdle first met in 1975 in the minor leagues and have stayed friends ever since. Sofield also previously worked with Pirates general manager Neal Huntington, assistant general manager Kyle Stark, Triple-A Indianapolis manager Dean Treanor, and pitching coordinator Jim Benedict. He served as a coach for the Pittsburgh Pirates under Hurdle from 2013 to 2016 In February 2018, Rick accepted the head varsity coaching position at Hilton Head Preparatory School, in HHI, SC.

References

External links
, or Retrosheet, or Pura Pelota

1956 births
Living people
Baseball players from Wyoming
Colorado Springs Sky Sox managers
Denver Bears players
Elizabethton Twins players
Las Vegas 51s managers
Major League Baseball first base coaches
Major League Baseball outfielders
Minnesota Twins players
Orlando Twins players
Sportspeople from Cheyenne, Wyoming
Pittsburgh Pirates coaches
Tacoma Twins players
Tigres de Aragua players
American expatriate baseball players in Venezuela
Toledo Mud Hens players
South Carolina Gamecocks baseball coaches
Utah Utes baseball coaches
Visalia Oaks players
Wisconsin Rapids Twins players
Morristown High School (Morristown, New Jersey) alumni
Sportspeople from Morris County, New Jersey
Baseball players from New Jersey